The Louisiana State Troopers Association (LSTA) is a non-profit fraternal police union that is made up primarily of current and retired Louisiana State Troopers.  The organization was formed in 1969. Its headquarters are in Baton Rouge, Louisiana.  The LSTA is committed to improved pay and benefits; to assuring a better working environment; to providing support when needed; and to increasing the quality of life for its members. It also strives to improve the public services provided by its members to the community. The organization publishes The Louisiana Trooper magazine.

According to the LSTA website, citizen's donations are accepted, but the organization never calls people's homes to solicit contributions.

External links
LSTA Website
Louisiana State Police Website

References

Law enforcement in Louisiana
Organizations based in Baton Rouge, Louisiana
1969 establishments in Louisiana